Into Red is the second studio album by Swedish American krautrock band, Fews. The album was released on 1 March 2019 through PIAS Recordings.

Background 
After a one-year hiatus, the band returned in mid-2018 with the release of a new single called "Business Man". On 13 November 2018, Fews announced that their second album, Into Red will be released on 1 March 2019.

Track listing

References

External links 

2019 albums
PIAS Recordings albums